The American Athletic Conference Men's Soccer Player of the Year are annual awards given to the best attacking, midfield, defensive, and goalkeeping players in the American Athletic Conference during the NCAA Division I men's soccer season.

Key

Offensive Player of the Year

Defensive Player of the Year

Midfielder of the Year

Goalkeeper of the Year

References

College soccer trophies and awards in the United States
American
Player of the Year
Awards established in 2013
2013 establishments in the United States